The Atlas-Able was an American expendable launch system derived from the SM-65 Atlas missile. It was a member of the Atlas family of rockets, and was used to launch several Pioneer spacecraft towards the Moon. Of the five Atlas-Able rockets built, two failed during static firings, and the other three failed to reach orbit.

The Atlas-Able was a three-and-a-half-stage rocket, with a stage-and-a-half Atlas missile as the first stage, an Able second stage, and an Altair third stage. The first Atlas-Able used an Atlas C as the first stage, but this exploded during a static fire test on 24 September 1959.

The remaining launches used Atlas D missiles. Launches were conducted from Launch Complexes 12 and 14 at the Cape Canaveral Air Force Station. One launch was planned from Launch Complex 13; this became the second Atlas-Able to be destroyed during a static firing, and hence never launched.

Launches

References

Rockets and missiles
Atlas (rocket family)